Innellan is a village in Argyll and Bute, Scotland, on the western shore of the Firth of Clyde. It is four miles south of Dunoon.

History 

The origin of the name "Innellan" is obscure. The village was developed as a holiday destination in Victorian times on the site of a smaller and older farming settlement, and the first steamboat pier was built in 1851. With a resident population of around 1,000, growing to many more in summer, Innellan found prosperity as one of many seaside resorts along the shores of the Firth of Clyde serving tourist traffic primarily coming from the city of Glasgow further upriver, travelling on Clyde steamers.

Notable people
 George Paton, recipient of the Victoria Cross
 John Thomas Rochead lived here briefly in 1871

Decline

This prosperity started to fade in the 1960s with the increasing availability of foreign holidays to the general public.  Competing against resorts in Europe that enjoyed Mediterranean climates, the popularity of all the Clyde seaside resorts fell.

It was around this time that an American naval base in the nearby Holy Loch was established, providing some aid to the local economy, although being controversial.  The base was withdrawn in the 1990s.

The village's most striking landmark from its heyday as a seaside resort - the large Royal Hotel that overlooked the pier - was destroyed by fire in 1981 and the site has yet to be redeveloped. The entrance gates to its former site on Pier Road still show the sign for the hotel.
Innellan's pier, which passenger steamers regularly called at whilst the area was booming, was extended in 1901 but finally closed in 1972 in response to reduced usage.  After falling into increasing disrepair, it was fully dismantled in the mid-1990s.

Primary school

Innellan Primary School was established in 1868.

Churches

Innellan once had four churches; two Church of Scotland, one Free Church and one Episcopal. Two of them still stand; the former West Church is now converted to a house, and the remaining (and still functioning) church was the charge of the Reverend Dr George Matheson, the blind minister who wrote the hymn "Oh Love that wilt not let me go." Although it is commonly believed that he wrote this hymn after he had been jilted by his fiancée, the truth is that he composed the hymn after experiencing a personal crisis.

The only history of Innellan ever printed was written by the Rev John Hill, minister of the West Church, in 1950. It is now out of print, and was somewhat preoccupied with religious affairs.

Innellan today 

Innellan, along with nearby Dunoon, has in recent years attempted to reclaim its role as a tourist destination.  Nowadays its appeal lies more in its being a pleasant and tranquil place of retreat, and as a potential location from which to commute to Glasgow or Dunoon.

Innellan boasts very impressive views across the Firth of Clyde, stretching from Kilcreggan and Loch Long (looking north) to Cumbrae Head and Ailsa Craig (looking south). There is a local golf club, with a 9-hole course on the hill.

The village's strip of shops (which once numbered fourteen) has now been reduced to just the Post Office. There are two pubs in the Village, The Osborne Bar/Restaurant/B&B and The Villagers Royal but other services are provided by the nearby town of Dunoon, which is linked by a bus service.

References

External links

Villages in Cowal
Highland Boundary Fault
Firth of Clyde
Highlands and Islands of Scotland